Unfinished is the third studio album by American singer-songwriter Jordan Knight, released on May 31, 2011. It is Knight's first album in almost five years since Love Songs (2006). The album was preceded by the lead single,  "Let's Go Higher" on March 1, 2011. The album charted at number 48 on the Billboard 200 in the United States, and at number 55 in Canada. The album features production by Jordan Knight, Clinton Sparks, Colby O'Donis, Aaron Pearce, Jonas Jeberg, Ryan M. Tedder (Not to be confused with Ryan Tedder of OneRepublic fame) and more.

Track listing 

Credited adapted from album liner notes.

Charts

References 

2011 albums
Jordan Knight albums
MNRK Music Group albums